The chief compliance officer (CCO) of a C-suite is the officer primarily responsible for overseeing and managing regulatory compliance issues within an organization. The CCO typically reports to the chief executive officer or the chief legal officer. 

The role has long existed at companies that operate in heavily regulated industries such as financial services and healthcare. For other companies, the rash of 2000s accounting scandals, the Sarbanes–Oxley Act, and the recommendations of the U.S. Federal Sentencing Guidelines have led to additional CCO appointments. 

Scott Cohen, editor and publisher of Compliance Week, dates the proliferation of CCOs to a 2002 speech by SEC commissioner Cynthia Glassman, in which she called on companies to designate a "corporate responsibility officer." The responsibilities of the position often include leading enterprise compliance efforts, designing and implementing internal controls, policies and procedures to assure compliance with applicable local, state and federal laws and regulations and third party guidelines; managing audits and investigations into regulatory and compliance issues; and responding to requests for information from regulatory bodies.

References

Corporate governance
Regulatory compliance
C